The Only Way is a 1970 war drama film about the Rescue of the Danish Jews starring Jane Seymour.

Plot
In October, 1943 in occupied Denmark, the Nazis decide to deport the Danish Jews to extermination camps. However, the Danish people decide to prevent this. Lillian Stein is a Jewish ballet teacher, learns of the Nazi plan, but her father, a violin dealer,  refuses to leave. The Nazi roundup nets very few Jews, because most have gone into hiding, protected by the Danish resistance.  Soldiers break into the Steins apartment, but they are not there, as they are hiding upstairs in the apartment of their friend, Mr. Petersen. The Resistance plans on how to get the Jews out of the country by hiring fishing boats to take them to neutral Sweden. Petersen meets with various people in an effort to get the Steins out of the country. Stein leaves the apartment to try and sell a valuable violin he owns to get funds.  When Dr. Kjær comes to pick up the family, Mrs. Stein refuses to leave without her husband and sends Lillian on ahead. The Nazis return to Stein’s shop, but he again eludes capture. The next day when the couple are leaving Petersen’s apartment, Lars, Stein's assistant  gives his life to prevent their capture. After some narrow escapes both Lillian and her parents reach the evacuation point. They get in a small boat and reach Sweden.

Cast

Martin Potter as Morten Jensen
Jane Seymour as Lillian Stein
Ebbe Rode as Mr. Stein
Helle Virkner as Mrs. Stein
Ove Sprogøe as Mr. Petersen
Bjørn Watt-Boolsen as Dr. Kjær
Benny Hansen as Lars

References

External links
 

1970 films
Rescue of Jews during the Holocaust
Films scored by Carl Davis
Films set in Denmark
Films set in the Baltic Sea
1970s English-language films
World War II films based on actual events